Sukheke railway station is located in Sukheke village, Hafizabad district of Punjab province, Pakistan.

See also
 List of railway stations in Pakistan
 Pakistan Railways

References

External links

Railway stations in Hafizabad District
Railway stations on Khanewal–Wazirabad Line